Afterburn may refer to:

 Excess post-exercise oxygen consumption, the burning of calories after vigorous exercise
 Back-fire, an unintended explosion produced by a vehicle's engine
 Afterburn (psychotherapy), a psychological term used during the application of psychotherapy
 Afterburn (film), a film starring Laura Dern
 Afterburner, an optional component in jet engines
 Agnelli & Nelson, who write and produce dance music, under the name Afterburn, among others
 Afterburn (roller coaster), a Bolliger & Mabillard coaster at Carowinds
 WWE Afterburn, a television show produced by World Wrestling Entertainment